C. beatrix may refer to:

Conus beatrix, a sea snail species
Cosmosoma beatrix, a moth species

See also
Beatrix (disambiguation)